Kalvanin Kadhali may refer to:
 Kalvanin Kadhali (novel)
 Kalvanin Kadhali (1955 film)
 Kalvanin Kadhali (2006 film)